The Boy Who Cried Wolf (Korean: 양치기 소년; RR: Yangchigi Sonyeon) is the first studio album of South Korean rapper San E. It was released on April 23, 2015, by Brand New Music.

Background 
Although San E had high expectations as a rapper, his previous albums Everybody Ready? and 'Not' Based on the True Story received negative reviews. In order to protect his reputation in the hip-hop scene, he announced that his studio album would prove that he is a great rapper in a track.

B-Free dissed San E in his track "My Team", which made San E diss him back in "On Top of Your Head".

Music and lyrics 
San E disses B-Free in "On Top of Your Head" on a Southern hip hop trap beat.

Critical reception 

Kim Doheon of IZM rated The Boy Who Cried Wolf 2 out of 5 stars.

Nam Seong-hun of Rhythmer also rated the album 2 out of 5 stars.

Track listing

Charts

Sales

References 

2015 albums
Korean-language albums
Hip hop albums by South Korean artists